Dancing is the act of performing dance.

Dancing may also refer to:

Music
 Dancin', a musical revue directed and choreographed by Bob Fosse

Albums
 Dancing (album), an album by Elisa
Dancing, 1988 compilation album by Australian band I'm Talking
Dancing, 2000 album by Mike Keneally
Dancing, 2013 album by Nancy Elizabeth

Songs
 "Dancing" (Elisa song)
 "Dancin'" (Guy song)
 "Dancing" (Mai Kuraki song)
 "Dancing" (Kylie Minogue song)
 "Dancing", by Orchestral Manoeuvres in the Dark from Orchestral Manoeuvres in the Dark
 "Dancin'", a 2004 song by Aaron Smith (DJ), remixed in 2014 by Krono

Television
 Dancing with the Stars, an American television program

Film
 Dancing (film), 1933
 Dancin': It's On!, 2015

See also 
 Dance (disambiguation)
 Dancer (disambiguation)
 The Dance (disambiguation)